Sergey Tsvetinsky (born 22 February 1984) is a Belarusian professional footballer.

In July 2020 Tsvetinsky was found guilty of being involved in a match-fixing schema in Belarusian football. He was sentenced to one year of community service and banned from Belarusian football for one year.

Honours
MTZ-RIPO Minsk
Belarusian Cup winner: 2004–05

References

External links

Profile at teams.by

1984 births
Living people
Belarusian footballers
Association football defenders
Belarusian expatriate footballers
Expatriate footballers in Latvia
FC Dinamo-Juni Minsk players
FC Partizan Minsk players
FC Naftan Novopolotsk players
FC Smorgon players
FC Savit Mogilev players
FC Belshina Bobruisk players
FC Granit Mikashevichi players
FC Gorodeya players
FC Slutsk players
BFC Daugavpils players
FC Torpedo Minsk players
FC Lida players
FC Molodechno players